Gao Dezhan (born 1932) is a People's Republic of China politician. He was born in Qixia, Shandong. He was a graduate of Dalian University of Technology. He was governor of Jilin and Chinese Communist Party Committee Secretary of Tianjin. He was an alternate member of the 12th Central Committee of the Chinese Communist Party and the 13th Central Committee of the Chinese Communist Party and a full member of the 14th Central Committee of the Chinese Communist Party. He was a member of the 9th Standing Committee of the National People's Congress. He was Director of the State Forestry Administration of the People's Republic of China (1987–1993).

References

1932 births
Living people
People's Republic of China politicians from Shandong
Chinese Communist Party politicians from Shandong
Governors of Jilin
Political office-holders in Tianjin
Dalian University of Technology alumni
Alternate members of the 12th Central Committee of the Chinese Communist Party
Alternate members of the 13th Central Committee of the Chinese Communist Party
Members of the 14th Central Committee of the Chinese Communist Party
Members of the Standing Committee of the 9th National People's Congress